Fred Durhal III (born April 1, 1984) is an American politician who currently serves as a member of the Detroit City Council. Durhal served as a member of the Michigan House of Representatives for the 5th District from 2015 to 2019. Durhal succeeded his father, Fred Durhal, Jr., in the House.

Early life and Career 
Durhal was born in Detroit to his parents, Fred and Martha Durhal. He is the second eldest of six children. Durhal attended Detroit Public Schools, including Guyton Elementary, Spain Middle School, and graduated from Detroit School of Arts. He later attended Eastern Michigan University, where he studied political science and music education.

Prior to his election, he served as an AmeriCorps volunteer in Northwest Detroit as the director of a literacy program for young children. He has collaborated with Village Builders of Northwest Detroit and Motor City Blight Busters to help stabilize neighborhoods within Detroit. In 2011, Durhal joined other community leaders to oppose Michigan’s emergency financial manager law in Benton Harbor and across the state. Durhal has also worked with Habitat for Humanity to help rebuild homes in Detroit. In 2004, he traveled to Benton Harbor with Habitat for Humanity, where he helped with the rebuilding of over 50 homes in one weekend.

Durhal has been a member of the Detroit Branch of the National Association for the Advancement of Colored People (NAACP), the Rainbow PUSH Coalition, and a former member of the Teamsters Local 377. He previously served on the board of the Dexter Elmhurst Community Center, and was formerly the President of Wayne County Progress PAC.

Political career 

Durhal was elected to the Michigan House of Representatives in 2014, succeeding his father. Taking office in January, 2015, he quickly found himself a leader in the Democratic caucus. He was appointed to the powerful House Appropriations Committee, serving as minority vice-chairman of the subcommittee on general government. House Democratic Leader Tim Greimel also appointed him Assistant Democratic Leader.

Durhal continued the work of his father, reintroducing legislation that would prohibit employers from requiring applicants to disclose prior felony convictions on job applications, so called "ban the box" legislation.

In 2016, Durhal passed his first bill HB 4187, which was signed into law by Governor Rick Snyder on May 10, 2016, and became PA 111 of 2016. This legislation established a misdemeanor for anyone who defaces, destroys, or dismantles any highway sign, traffic sign, structure, or railroad in the State.

After being re-elected to a second term in 2016, Durhal was appointed by Speaker of the House Tom Leonard and House Democratic Leader Sam Singh to serve as the Minority Vice-Chair of the House Appropriations Committee, making him the ranking Democrat on the committee. He was also elected by his Detroit colleagues to serve as the Secretary of the Detroit Caucus.

In 2021, Durhal was elected to the Detroit City Council to represent the 7th District. Shortly after being elected, Durhal was appointed December 1, 2021, to fill the vacancy for the 7th District. He was sworn into his second term on January 1, 2022. Durhal was appointed to serve as Chair of the Budget, Finance, and Audit Standing Committee and Vice-Chair of the Planning and Economic Development Standing Committee. Durhal also serves as a member of the Eastern Market Partnership Board of Directors.

Election Results (2014) 
Durhal was successful in winning the November 2014 General Election to be elected to his first term.

Election Results (2016) 
Durhal was successfully re-elected to his second term by winning the November 2016 General Election.

Personal life 
Durhal is a member of and worships at Unity Baptist Church in Detroit. He is engaged to attorney Briaunna Buckner.

References

External links 
 

Democratic Party members of the Michigan House of Representatives
Politicians from Detroit
Eastern Michigan University alumni
African-American state legislators in Michigan
21st-century American politicians
21st-century African-American politicians
20th-century African-American people
1984 births
Living people